KMOL-LD (channel 17) is a low-power television station in Victoria, Texas, United States, affiliated with NBC. It is owned by Morgan Murphy Media alongside ABC affiliate KAVU-TV (channel 25) and four other low-power stations: Univision affiliate KUNU-LD (channel 21), Cozi TV affiliate KQZY-LD (channel 33), CBS affiliate KXTS-LD (channel 41), and Telemundo affiliate KVTX-LD (channel 45). Morgan Murphy Media also provides certain services to Fox affiliate KVCT (channel 19) under a local marketing agreement (LMA) with SagamoreHill Broadcasting. All of the stations share studios on North Navarro Street in Victoria and transmitter facilities on Farm to Market Road 236 west of the city.

KMOL-LP has operated since October 5, 2004.

Unlike most NBC affiliates, KMOL-LD does not show any form of local newscast; however, it does produce local news cut-ins for The Today Show, as well as an evening weather brief.

Subchannels
The station's digital signal is multiplexed:

External links 
 
 

Morgan Murphy Media stations
MOL-LD
Television channels and stations established in 2004
Low-power television stations in the United States
2004 establishments in Texas
NBC network affiliates
Movies! affiliates